Katthegalu Saar Katthegalu is a 2003 Indian Kannada-language comedy film directed by Rajendra Singh Babu. The film stars Ramesh Aravind, S. Narayan, Komal Kumar, Meghana Naidu and Urvashi. This is the third film in the "Saar" series directed by Babu and was released on 28 March 2003 and received generally positive reviews from the critics.

Cast

Ramesh Aravind as Romy
S. Narayan as Nani
Komal Kumar as Komi
Urvashi as Urmila
Meghana Naidu as Nandhini 
Soni Raj as Kapila 
Umashree as Jayamma
 Yamuna Murthy 
 Manjula
Jai Jagadish as Prakash 
Sundar Raj
Kote Prabhakar
M. P. Shankar
 Kirloskar Sathya 
 Bullet Prakash
 Sathyajith
 Harish Rai 
 Renuka Prasad 
 Bank Suresh
 MS Narasimhamurthy

Soundtrack

Release and reception 
The film competed with forty-one other films for the Karnataka State Film Awards, but it was not nominated.

A critic from Viggy wrote that "In a nutshell, is a watchable film if you opt for an average comedy entertainer". A critic from Chitraloka said that "For every five minutes in this nearly 2 hours 40 minutes film the audience would laugh. They feel a respite as scores of Kannada films doled out below average films in the last three months leaving a danger. However Babu’s ‘KK3’ finally gives wonderful output".

Box office 
The film's budget was negatively affected by the change of timings in Kannada and Hindi film theatres.

References

External links
 

2003 films
2000s Kannada-language films
Films set in Bangalore
Films scored by Hamsalekha
Indian comedy films
Indian film series
Films directed by Rajendra Singh Babu